Book arts may refer to:

 Artist's books, works of art in the form of a book
 Book illustration, illustration in a book
 Book design, the art of designing a book
 Bookbinding, the process of creating a book